Guipronvel is a former commune in the Finistère department of Brittany in north-western France. On 1 January 2017, it was merged into the new commune Milizac-Guipronvel.

Population
Inhabitants of Guipronvel are called in French
Guipronvélois.

See also
Communes of the Finistère department

References

External links

Former communes of Finistère